Deacon is a ministry in Christian churches that is generally associated with service of some kind, but which varies among theological and denominational traditions.

Deacon, the Deacon or Deacons may also refer to:

People

Name
 Deacon (name), a list of people with either the surname or, more rarely, the given name

Nickname
 William Brodie (1741–1788), Scottish master woodworker and city councillor, who burgled from his elite clientele and inspired The Strange Case of Dr Jekyll and Mr Hyde
 Irving Crane (1913–2001), American pool player nicknamed "the Deacon"
 Steve Hunter (born 1948), American guitarist nicknamed "the Deacon"
 Deacon Jones (1938–2013), professional football player and actor
 Deacon Jones (infielder) (born 1934), American baseball infielder
 Deacon Jones (pitcher) (1892–1952), American baseball pitcher
 Deacon Jones (athlete) (1934–2007), American Olympic steeplechase runner
 Deacon McGuire (1863–1936), Major League Baseball catcher, manager and coach
 Deacon Phillippe (1872–1952), Major League Baseball pitcher
 Deacon Turner (1955–2011), American National Football League player
 Deacon White (1847–1939), star baseball catcher at the start of the professional era

Epithet
 List of people known as the Deacon

Fictional characters
 Deacon (comics), a Marvel comic book villain and foe of Ghost Rider
 Deacon Claybourne, on the TV series Nashville
 Deacon Frost, a Marvel Comics vampire
 Deacon Palmer, on the TV series The King of Queens
 Deacon Sharpe, on the soap operas The Bold and The Beautiful and The Young and the Restless
 The Deacon (The Wire), on the TV series The Wire
 Deacon St. John, the protagonist of the video game Days Gone

Title
 Deacon, Scots usage for the leader of a trade guild
 Deacon, an officer in a Masonic Lodge

Places in the United States
 Deacon, Indiana, an unincorporated community
 Deacons, New Jersey, an unincorporated community

Other uses
 Deacon (album), second studio album by American singer-songwriter serpentwithfeet
 Deacon (artillery), a British armoured fighting vehicle of the Second World War
 Deacon (rocket), a sounding rocket
 Nike-Deacon, an American sounding rocket
 Deacons (law firm), which operates in Hong Kong and the People's Republic of China

See also
 Cardinal Deacon, the lowest-ranking of three orders in the College of Cardinals in the Roman Catholic Church
 Deacon process, a chemical process used in the manufacture of alkalies
 Deacon's School, a school from 1721 to 2007 in Dogsthorpe, Peterborough, England
 Wake Forest Demon Deacons, the athletic program of Wake Forest University
 Demon Deacon, a costumed student who serves as Wake Forest's mascot

Lists of people by nickname